Symphlebia palmeri is a moth in the subfamily Arctiinae. It was described by Rothschild in 1910. It is found in Colombia.

References

Moths described in 1910
Symphlebia